William of Exeter was a fourteenth-century English author.

William was the author of certain ‘Determinationes’ against Ockham, ‘De Mendicitate, contra fratres,’ ‘Pro Ecclesiæ Paupertate,’ and ‘De Generatione Christi,’ who is said to have been a doctor of divinity and canon of Exeter, and who may be presumed to have written between about 1320 and 1340.

References

Year of birth missing
14th-century deaths
14th-century English writers
Writers from Exeter
14th-century Latin writers
Clergy from Exeter